HW or Hw may refer to:

Transportation 
 Haridwar Railway Station, Haridwar, India, station code
 Hello (airline), IATA airline designator
 North-Wright Airways, IATA airline designator

Other uses
 George H. W. Bush (1924–2018), 41st President of the United States
 Hartford Whalers, US ice hockey team
 Hot Wheels
 Hantzsche–Wendt manifold
 hectowatt (hW) metric unit of power, 1 hW = 100 watt
 Hwair, a Gothic letter
 Voiceless labialized velar approximant /ʍ/, often transcribed /hw/
 Homework, tasks assigned to students to be completed out of class

See also

 
 WH (disambiguation)